Maharanipeta mandal is one of the 11 mandals in Visakhapatnam district of Andhra Pradesh in India. It is administered under Visakhapatnam revenue division and its headquarters is located at Maharanipeta. The mandal lies on the coast of Bay of Bengal and is bounded by Visakhapatnam Rural to the north and Visakhapatnam Urban-1 to the west.

There are no villages in this mandal as it is located within the jurisdiction of Greater Visakhapatnam Municipal Corporation, which is responsible for the civic amenities of Maharanipeta.

References

Mandals in Visakhapatnam district